This is a list of results and records for the USA Rugby National Collegiate Men's Rugby Championships, which began in 1980. The 1984–1988 and 1990 editions were played in conjunction with the Annual Pebble Beach Rugby Classic. In 2010, several of the top college teams agreed to form the College Premier League, now known as Division 1-A Rugby to begin play in spring 2011. This list does not include records from the breakaway invitational Varsity Cup Championship held between 2013 and 2017, nor from the rival National Collegiate Rugby Organization's D1 championship that began in 2021.

Performances

Championship results

Titles by University

Finals appearances by state

Playoff Results

1980s
1980

1981

1982

1983

1984

1985

1986

1987

1988

1989

1990s
1990

2010s
2011

2012

2013

2014

2015

2016

2017

2018

2019

2020s
2022

See also
 Collegiate Rugby Championship
 Division 1-A Rugby
 College rugby
 Intercollegiate sports team champions
 Varsity Cup Championship

References

results